REZ: Compact Favorites was the 11th release, and second compilation album, by American Christian rock band Resurrection Band, known at this point as "REZ", released in 1988.

Recording history
Compact Favorites was the name given to a series of CDs by Sparrow Records for several artists on its roster, including Sheila Walsh, AD, Steve Camp and Michele Pillar.  Because CDs were relatively new to the Christian market and still considered a premium format, the idea was to compile the best tracks from albums that weren't likely to be released on CD anytime soon.  Since REZ was with Sparrow for only a brief period, the tracks on this album are pulled from just three albums: Live Bootleg, Hostage, and Between Heaven 'N Hell.

Track listing
 "Love Comes Down"
 "Crimes"
 "Defective Youth"
 "Gameroom"
 "S.O.S."
 "Military Man"
 "Medley" ("Waves," "Awaiting Your Reply," "Broken Promises," "Autograph," "City Streets")
 "The Main Event"
 "2,000"
 "Shadows"

Personnel
 Glenn Kaiser - vocals, guitar, keyboards
 Wendi Kaiser - vocals
 Stu Heiss - guitar, keyboards
 Jim Denton - fretless bass, synthesizer
 John Herrin - drums, percussion

Resurrection Band albums
1988 greatest hits albums